Arliss is a unisex given name and nickname which may refer to:

People
 Arliss Howard (born 1954), American actor, writer and film director
 Arliss Ryan (born 1950), American novelist, short story writer and essayist
 Arliss Sturgulewski (born 1927), American retired businesswoman and politician
 Arliss Watford (1924–1998), American woodcarver

Fictional characters
Arliss Michaels, protagonist of the American television series Arliss

Unisex given names